The conventional title Chronicon Austriacum has been used for several medieval chronicles:

Chronicon Austriacum anonymi (973–1327)
Breve chronicon Austriacum (1018–1279)
Chronicon Vatzonis (12th–13th centuries), also called the Chronicon Austriacum
Annales Zwetlenses (12th–14th centuries), also called the Zwetlensis monachi chronicon Austriacum
Breve chronicon Austriacum Mellicense ad annum 1157
Chronicon rhythmicum Austriacum (c. 1270)
Breve chronicon Austriacum (1402–43)
Chronicon Austriae (1463), also called the Chronicon Austriacum
Breve chronicon Austriacum Mellicense ad annum 1464
Chronicon Austriacarum (1454–67), also called the Anonymi Chronicon Austriacum
Österreichische Chronik (1488), also called the Chronicon Austriacum